Venkateswara Rao or Venkateshwara Rao is one of the Indian names.  It may refer to:

 Daggubati Venkateswara Rao (born 1959), member of the Indian National Congress
 Ghantasala Venkateswara Rao, South Indian singer and music director
 Gummadi Venkateswara Rao  (1927–2010), Telugu film actor
 Inturi Venkateswara Rao, Indian film journalist.
 Kotagiri Venkateswara Rao, Indian film editor
 Mangina Venkateswara Rao, famous agricultural scientist and Vice Chancellor of Acharya N. G. Ranga Agricultural University.
 Narla Venkateswara Rao (1908–1985), journalist
 Narra Venkateswara Rao (died 2009), Telugu actor
 Kadiyala Venkateswara Rao, freelance archaeologist and retired deputy director of Sports, Andhra Pradesh